The 2003–04 West Midlands (Regional) League season was the 104th in the history of the West Midlands (Regional) League, an English association football competition for semi-professional and amateur teams based in the West Midlands county, Shropshire, Herefordshire, Worcestershire and southern Staffordshire.

Premier Division

The Premier Division featured 19 clubs which competed in the division last season, along with two new clubs:
Newport (Shropshire), promoted from Division One North
Wednesfield, relegated from the Midland Football Alliance

Also, Little Drayton Rangers changed name to Market Drayton Town and Sedgeley White Lions changed name to Coseley Town.

League table

References

External links

2003–04
9